The 2023 Junior Africa Cup will be an international field hockey competition held from 12 to 16 March 2023 in Ismailia, Egypt.

The tournament served as a direct qualifier for the 2023 Junior World Cup, with the winner and runner-up qualifying.

South Africa won their fifth title after defeating the defending champions Egypt in the final 4–3 in a shoot-out after the match finished 2–2 in regular time.

Qualified teams
The following teams have qualified for the tournament.

Preliminary round

Standings

Matches

Final round

Third place match

Final

Awards
The following awards were given at the conclusion of the tournament.

Final standings

Goalscorers

See also
 2023 Women's Hockey Junior Africa Cup

References

Hockey Junior Africa Cup
Junior Africa cup
Africa cup
Junior Africa cup
Sport in Cairo
International field hockey competitions hosted by Egypt
21st century in Cairo
Junior Africa cup
Africa Cup